Polixène (Polyxena) is an opera by the French composer Antoine Dauvergne, first performed at the Académie Royale de Musique (the Paris Opéra) on 11 January 1763. It takes the form of a tragédie lyrique in five acts. The libretto, by Nicolas-René Joliveau, is based on Euripides and tells the story of the Trojan princess Polyxena. The opera was dedicated to Emmanuel-Félicité de Durfort de Duras.

Roles

Synopsis
The action takes place in the aftermath of the Trojan War. Pyrrhus (son of Achilles) wants to marry Polyxena, but the goddess Juno and Queen Hecuba of Troy, (Polyxena's mother) oppose him. Juno hates the Trojans and would not wish to see a marriage uniting the son of Achilles with the daughter of Hecuba. Hecuba hates Pyrrhus for slaughtering her family. Pyrrhus' friend Telephus is also a rival for Polyxena’s love and he has Hecuba's blessing. Hecuba urges him to kill Pyrrhus. However, Thetis, Pyrrhus' grandmother, manages to appease Juno. When Telephus refuses to kill Pyrrhus, Hecuba has him killed instead. Finally, Hecuba is won over and consents to the marriage of Polyxena and Pyrrhus.

Sources
David Charlton Opera in the Age of Rousseau: Music, Confrontation, Realism, Cambridge University Press, 2012.
 Félix Clément and Pierre Larousse Dictionnaire des Opéras, Paris, 1881.
 Benoït Dratwicki, Antoine Dauvergne (1713—1797): une carrière tourmentée dans la France musicale des Lumières, Editions Mardaga, 2011.

External links
Polixène (complete score at the Bibliothèque nationale de France) 

Operas
Tragédies en musique
French-language operas
1763 operas
Operas by Antoine Dauvergne